County police, often (but not always) called county sheriffs in the United States, are police forces existing primarily in the United States that possess primary jurisdiction over an entire county. England and Wales, two constituent countries of the United Kingdom, are policed by territorial police forces which are largely formed on a county basis. Historically, Northern Ireland and Scotland, the other two constituent countries of the UK, have had county police, although both countries now have unified national police services.

Sweden 
Until the end of 2014, all of the 21 counties of Sweden had its own County Police Department. In 2015, Sweden merged all local police departments into a single police agency, dividing the country into seven police regions instead.

United Kingdom

 In England, the police are divided into 39 regional forces, which all provide full services throughout their districts.
 In Wales, the police are divided into 4 regional forces, which all provide full services throughout their districts.
 In Northern Ireland and Scotland, the police are national forces, which provide full services.

Territorial police forces
Territorial police forces that have a presence at a regional and county level in England and Wales are:

 Avon and Somerset Constabulary
 Bedfordshire Police
 Cambridgeshire Constabulary
 Cheshire Constabulary
 City of London Police
 Cleveland Police
 Cumbria Constabulary
 Derbyshire Constabulary
 Devon and Cornwall Police
 Dorset Police
 Durham Constabulary
 Dyfed–Powys Police 
 Essex Police 
 Gloucestershire Constabulary 
 Greater Manchester Police 
 Gwent Police 
 Hampshire Constabulary 
 Hertfordshire Constabulary 
 Humberside Police 
 Kent Police 
 Lancashire Constabulary 
 Leicestershire Police
 Lincolnshire Police 
 Merseyside Police 
 Metropolitan Police 
 Norfolk Constabulary 
 North Wales Police 
 Northamptonshire Police 
 Northumbria Police 
 North Yorkshire Police 
 Nottinghamshire Police 
 Police Service of Northern Ireland 
 Police Scotland 
 South Wales Police 
 South Yorkshire Police
 Staffordshire Police 
 Suffolk Constabulary 
 Surrey Police 
 Sussex Police 
 Thames Valley Police 
 Warwickshire Police 
 West Mercia Police 
 West Midlands Police 
 West Yorkshire Police 
 Wiltshire Police

United States
In the United States, the powers, duties, and even existence of county police forces vary widely depending on the state, and even on the particular county (parish in Louisiana) within a state. County police forces as autonomous entities are relatively rare and tend to exist only in metropolitan counties. Many states also have a county sheriff's office which are usually formed on a county basis and traditionally carry out duties related to the functioning of the courts and legal system, such as service of process, executing legal writs, and protection for the local courthouse and its judges. Many state constitutions mandate that the position of sheriff be created, which leads many states to also give sheriffs the duties of a county police to avoid having overlapping departments with similar duties, leaving the sheriff as the exclusive law enforcement agency for a county. Some counties that previously had both a county police force and a sheriff's office have merged the two, leaving the sheriff in command of the unified force, as the sheriff derives his power directly from the constitution; the most prominent example of such a merger is the Las Vegas Metropolitan Police Department which is actually led by the county sheriff despite its name.

County police tend to fall into three broad categories:
Full-service police departments, which provide the full spectrum of police services to the entire county, irrespective of local communities, and may provide contractual security police services to special districts within the county.
Hawaii has only county police; there are no local police.
Limited service police departments, which provide services to unincorporated areas of the county (and may provide services to some incorporated areas by contract), and usually provide contractual security police services to special districts within the county.
Restricted service police departments, which provide security police duties to county owned and operated facilities and parks. Some may also perform some road patrol duties on county built and maintained roads, and provide support to municipal police departments in the county.

Note: County detectives, who are maintained in the northeastern states by county attorneys' offices, fall within this category. In the state of Louisiana, a county is known as a parish. In the state of Alaska, a county is known as a borough. The only borough in Alaska to have their own police department is North Slope Borough.

U.S. departments

There are 3,141 counties in the United States and some of the following county police departments are:

A to M
Albemarle County Police Department, Albemarle County, Virginia - full service
Allegany County Bureau of Police, Allegany County, Maryland - full service, a division of the Allegany County Sheriff's Office.
Allegheny County Police Department, Allegheny County, Pennsylvania - County-wide Authority - Detective Division- Uniform patrol county facilities and property.
Anne Arundel County Police Department, Anne Arundel County, Maryland - full service
Arlington County Police Department, Arlington County, Virginia - full service
Athens-Clarke County Police Department, Clarke County, Georgia - full service
Baltimore County Police, Baltimore County, Maryland - full service
Bergen County Police Department, Bergen County, New Jersey - (Merged with the Bergen County Sheriff's Office and renamed "Bureau of Police Services" in 2015)
Broome County Sheriff's Department, Broome County, New York - full service
Broomfield Police Department, City and County of Broomfield, Colorado - full service
Broward County Department of Law Enforcement, Broward County, Florida- limited service
Cobb County Police Department, Cobb County, Georgia- Full service
Camden County Police Department, Camden County, New Jersey - limited service
Charlotte-Mecklenburg Police Department, Mecklenburg County, North Carolina - limited service (Only serves the city of Charlotte and works contracts with municipalities in Mecklenburg County after a loss of contract with the county making Mecklenburg County Sheriff the primary county law enforcement agency)
Chatham County Police Department, Chatham County, Georgia - full service
Chesterfield County Police Department, Chesterfield County, Virginia - full service
Clark County Park Police, Clark County, Nevada - restricted service
Clayton County Police Department, Clayton County, Georgia - limited service
Cook County Sheriff's Office, Cook County, Illinois - limited service
DeKalb County Sheriff's Office,  DeKalb County, Alabama - full service
Dougherty County Police Department, Dougherty County, Georgia- limited service
DeKalb County Police Department, DeKalb County, Georgia - limited service (By statute, DKPD has authority throughout the entire county, but yields this authority to incorporated municipalities that provide their own police services.)
Delaware County Courthouse and Park Police Department, Delaware County, Pennsylvania - restricted service
Denver Police Department, City and County of Denver, Colorado - full service
Fairfax County Police Department, Fairfax County, Virginia - full service
 Floyd County Police Department, Floyd County, Georgia - full service
Floyd County Sheriff's Office, Floyd County, Georgia - limited service
Fulton County Sheriff's Office, Fulton County, Georgia - limited service
Gaston County Police Department, Gaston County, North Carolina - limited service
Glynn County Police Department, Glynn County, Georgia
Gwinnett County Police Department, Gwinnett County, Georgia - full service (serves unincorporated Gwinnett County, and the cities of Berkeley Lake, Buford, Dacula, Grayson, Rest Haven, Peachtree Corners, and Sugar Hill)
Hawai‘i County Police Department, Hawaii County, Hawaii - full service
Henrico County Police Department, Henrico County, Virginia - full service
Henry County Police Department, Henry County, Georgia - limited service
Honolulu Police Department, City and County of Honolulu, Hawaii - full service
Horry County Police Department, Horry County, South Carolina - limited service (full-time service of all unincorporated areas of Horry County, South Carolina and part-time service of certain municipalities within the county by contract)
Houston County Sheriff's Department, Houston County, Georgia - limited service
Howard County Police Department, Howard County, Maryland - full service
Howard County Sheriff's Office, Howard County, Maryland - limited service (full-time service for eight geographical sectors in Howard County) 

James City County Police Department, James City County, Virginia - full service
Johnson County Sheriffs Department, Johnson County, Kentucky -Full Service
Kauai County Police Department, Kauai County, Hawaii - full service
Kenton County Police Department, Kenton County, Kentucky - limited service
Las Vegas Metropolitan Police Department, Clark County, Nevada - limited service
Lexington Division of Police, Fayette County, Kentucky - full service
Los Alamos County Police Department, Los Alamos County, New Mexico- full service
Louisville Metro Police Department, Louisville and Jefferson County, Kentucky
Maryland-National Capital Park Police Department, Montgomery County, Maryland and Prince George's County, Maryland - restricted service
Maui County Police Department, Maui County, Hawaii - full service
Mercer County Correctional, Mercer County, New Jersey - limited service
Metropolitan Nashville Police Department, Davidson County, Tennessee - full service
Miami-Dade Police Department, Miami-Dade County, Florida - limited service
Montgomery County Police Department, Montgomery County, Maryland - full service
Morris County Park Police Department, Morris County, New Jersey - restricted service

N to Z
Nassau County Police Department, Nassau County, New York - full service
New Castle County Police Department, New Castle County, Delaware - full service
New Orleans Police Department, Orleans Parish, Louisiana - full service
New York City Police Department, covers five New York counties, Bronx County, Kings County, New York County, Queens County, and Richmond County - full service
Oldham County Police Department, Oldham County, Kentucky - limited service
Onondaga County Sheriff's Office, Onondaga County, New York - full service
Orangeburg County Sheriff’s Office, Orangeburg County, South Carolina- Full service
Philadelphia Police Department, Philadelphia County, Pennsylvania - full service
Pima County Park Police Department, Pima County, Arizona - restricted service
Prince George County Police Department, Prince George County, Virginia - Full Service
Prince George's County Police Department, Prince George's County, Maryland - Full service
Prince William County Police Department, Prince William County, Virginia - Full service
Polk County Police Department,  Polk County, Georgia - limited service
Riley County Police Department, Riley County, Kansas - full service
Roanoke County Police Department, Roanoke County, Virginia - full service
St. Joseph County Police Department, St. Joseph County, Indiana - limited service
St. Louis County Police Department, St. Louis County, Missouri - full-service
San Francisco Police Department, City and County of San Francisco, California - full service
St. Charles County Police Department, St. Charles County, Missouri- full service
Savannah-Chatham Metropolitan Police Department, Chatham County, Georgia - limited service (serves the city of Savannah and unincorporated Chatham County)
Spotsylvania County Sheriff's Office, Spotsylvania County, Virginia
Suffolk County Park Police Department, Suffolk County, New York - restricted service
Suffolk County Police Department, Suffolk County, New York - limited service
Union County Police Department, Union County, New Jersey - restricted service
Westchester County Department of Public Safety, Westchester County, New York - restricted service
Westmoreland County Park Police Department, Westmoreland County, Pennsylvania - restricted service

References

Law enforcement units